Judith Angela Broderick (born 22 July 1963), popularly known as Judy Ditchfield, is a South African actress and singer. She is best known for her roles in the popular serials The Story of an African Farm, Cape Town and Hoodlum & Son. She is also a successful businessman as well as UK trained as a BRP and facilitator.

Personal life
She was born on 22 July 1963 in Pretoria, South Africa and later grew up in Irene. At the age of six, she moved to Kimberley with her parents. Then at the age of 13, her family again moved to Pietermaritzburg. From 1984 to 1987, she spent in Durban and then moved to Johannesburg. She attended several schools: Belgravia Junior School and Herlear Primary in Kimberley for primary education. Then she attended to Pelham Primary school for Standard 5. Then she completed matric exams in Pietermaritzburg Girls High School, Pietermaritzburg.

Then she obtained her BA Degree in Psychology and Drama at the University of Natal, Pietermaritzburg. From 1984 to 1987 after graduation, she worked at the Natal Performing Arts Council (NAPAC).

She is married to actor and musician Paul Ditchfield. The couple has two sons: Keaton and Tom. Keaton was born in 1991 and is also an actor. Tom was born in 1996 and studies B.Com. Law at University of Wits.

Career
She started acting career in theatre with Loft Theatre Company, a branch of NAPAC. During this period, he performed in the plays Boo To The Moon produced by Paul Slabolepszy, Tales From The Pleasure Palace by Janice Honeyman, Kwamanzi, Every Good Boy Deserves Favour, Hambe Kahle, Maid In South Africa, Mistakes Of An African Night To Conquer, En Dit Was More, In The War and Kitchen Tea. Then she performed in the play Macbeth at the State Theatre in Pretoria as well as in the plays The Things We Do For Love and Comrades Arms produced by Anthony Ackerman. In 2001, she earned a Kwazulu-Natal Vita nomination for Best Female Performance In A Comedy Role.

Apart from acting, she is also a prolific singer and made several popular hits and musical appearances: Christian; Neill Solomon Rock Concert; Bursting Out; Soundcraft; The Last Great Drive-In Movie Picture Show; It's All Fright By Me; It's Still Rock And Roll To Me; Tarts; A Touch Of Tonic; the smash hit Richard Loring production A Touch Of Webber, A Taste Of Rice; Snow White And The Seven Dwarves; Buddy: The Buddy Holly Story; Fiela's Child: The Musical; The Night They Invented Champagne; and Queen: The Concert at the Sandton Convention Centre.

From October 2006 to March 2007, she starred in Menopause: The Musical for Showtime Management which was staged at the Montecasino Theatre in Johannesburg. During this period, she received a 2006 Naledi Theatre Award nomination for Best Comedy Performance (Female) for this play. Meanwhile, she appeared in several television shows including The Game II, Sonnekring II, Suburban Bliss and Streaks I and II. She also played lead roles in the serials; Angels, Hoof Of Africa, Zero Tolerance and Yizo Yizo. In 2012, she appeared in the television sitcom Ses'Top La and played the role of 'Mrs. Rabinowitz'.

In 2019, she played the role 'Stella Fouche' in the popular soapie Isidingo. She also made appearances in the films, Faith's Corner, Glory Glory, Cape Of Good Hope and Stander.

Filmography

References

External links
 

Living people
South African television actresses
South African stage actresses
South African film actresses
1963 births